Stundande natten (lit. Night Approaching) is a 2007 novel by Swedish author Carl-Henning Wijkmark. It won the August Prize in 2007.

References

2007 Swedish novels
Swedish-language novels
August Prize-winning works